The 37th Regiment Illinois Volunteer Infantry, nicknamed the "Fremont Rifles" and "Illinois Greyhounds",  was an infantry regiment that served in the Union Army during the American Civil War.

Organization
The 37th Illinois Infantry was organized at Chicago, Illinois, and mustered into Federal service on September 18, 1861.

Action

Battle of Elkhorn Tavern / Pea Ridge
The Regiment suffered  casualties of the 54 members of Company A: 5 killed, 4 mortally wounded and 24 wounded.

Disbanding
The regiment was mustered out on May 15, 1866.

Total strength and casualties
The regiment suffered 7 officers and 91 enlisted men who were killed in action or who died of their wounds and 5 officers and 164 enlisted men who died of disease, for a total of 267 fatalities.

Commanders
 Colonel Julius White – mustered on September 18, 1861; promoted to brigadier general on June 9, 1862.
 Colonel Myron S. Barnes – dismissed on disability on November 20, 1862.
 Colonel John C. Black – resigned August 15, 1866 (as brigadier general).
 Colonel Ransom Kennicott – mustered out with the regiment (as lieutenant colonel).

See also
 List of Illinois Civil War Units
 Illinois in the American Civil War

References

External links
 Arnold, Bruce Makoto. "A Horse to Live and a Greyhound to Die: Early Civil War Experiences of Robert and James Thompson." Details the lives of two brothers, one of whom served in the 37th Illinois.

Units and formations of the Union Army from Illinois
1861 establishments in Illinois
Military units and formations established in 1861
Military units and formations disestablished in 1866
1866 disestablishments in Illinois